R. J. Palmer II (born December 25, 1970) is an American politician from the state of Kentucky. A member of the Democratic Party, he served in the Kentucky State Senate from September 19, 2001 to January 1, 2015. Palmer was the minority leader of the Kentucky Senate from January 1, 2011 to January 1, 2015.

Palmer is from Winchester, Kentucky. He served in the Kentucky House of Representatives from January 1, 1999 through September 19, 2001, and served in the Kentucky Senate from 2001 until he was defeated by challenger Ralph Alvarado and replaced in 2015. His senate district included Bath, Bourbon, Clark, Harrison, Montgomery, Nicholas counties.

References

External links
Official page at the Legislative Research Commission
 

1970 births
Living people
Democratic Party Kentucky state senators
Democratic Party members of the Kentucky House of Representatives
People from Winchester, Kentucky